|}

The Corrib Fillies Stakes is a Listed flat horse race in Ireland open to mares and fillies aged three years or older. It is run at Galway over a distance of 7 furlongs (1,408 metres), and it is scheduled to take place each year at the Galway Festival in late July or early August.

The race was first run in 2012.

Records
Most successful horse (2 wins):
 Surrounding (2019,2022)

Leading jockey (2 wins):
 Declan McDonogh – Laviniad (2015), Planchart (2016)
 Ronan Whelan -  Surrounding (2019,2022) 

Leading trainer (2 wins):
Dermot Weld - Yellow Rosebud (2013), Yulong Gold Fairy (2018) 
Johnny Murtagh – Dalkova (2014), Champers Elysees (2020)
 Michael Halford -  Surrounding (2019,2022)

Winners

See also
 Horse racing in Ireland
 List of Irish flat horse races

References 
Racing Post:

Flat races in Ireland
Mile category horse races for fillies and mares
Ballybrit Racecourse
2012 establishments in Ireland
Recurring sporting events established in 2012